NIST International School is an international school located in the Watthana District of Bangkok, Thailand. It was established in 1992 with support and guidance from the Bangkok-based branch of the United Nations. A full International Baccalaureate (IB) World School, NIST welcomes more than 1,700 students of over 60 nationalities. As one of the only not-for-profit international schools in Thailand, it is governed by the parent-elected NIST International School Foundation.

History 
NIST opened in August, 1992 as the New International School of Thailand on the previous campus of International School Bangkok. The school was established with the support of the United Nations and is not tied to any national curriculum or approach. NIST was authorized to offer the IB Diploma Programme in 1993 and the IB Middle Years Programme in 1996. In 1997 it saw off its first group of graduates, and in 1998 it received dual accreditation through the Council of International Schools and New England Association of Schools and Colleges. NIST is also accredited by Thailand's Office for National Education Standards and Quality Assessment. With the addition of the IB Primary Years Programme in 1999, it became the first school in Thailand to offer all three IB programmes. NIST was renamed NIST International School in 2012 on the occasion of its 20th anniversary.

NIST is currently operated by a non-profit organization, the NIST International School Foundation (NIST Foundation). Former chairs of the NIST Foundation include Mechai Viravaidya and Pridiyathorn Devakula, and the current chair is Sarath Ratanavadi.

Accreditation and affiliation 
NIST is accredited by the Council of International Schools (CIS), the New England Association of Schools and Colleges (NEASC) since 1998 and the Office for National Education Standards and Quality Assessment (ONESQA). It was the first school in Thailand to receive triple accreditation. Additionally, NIST is a member of the East Asia Regional Council of Overseas Schools and the International Schools Association of Thailand.

Several organizations and programs are based on NIST's campus, including master's programs for University at Buffalo, The State University of New York and The College of New Jersey, the Professional Learning Hub, and the JUMP! Foundation's Global Leadership Center. NIST is also the home of Top Flight Basketball Academy, run by ex-NBA player Ike Nwankwo, and Chelsea F.C. International Development Centre Bangkok.

Campus 
NIST's campus is located in downtown Bangkok near Asok BTS Station, one of Bangkok's commercial hubs. In 2000 the school presented its development plan and began construction on new facilities in 2001. As of 2014, it has expanded its physical facilities and now possesses dedicated buildings for the early years, elementary and secondary sections. It also includes a sports complex, creative arts building and two additional multi-purpose buildings. A fourth multi-purpose building, the Hub, was completed in June 2014, while renovation of the older facilities began.

Arts facilities include a 300-seat theatre, multiple visual arts studios, multiple dance studios, multiple instrumental and vocal music rooms, private practice rooms and a recording studio. The sports complex includes a FIFA-certified football pitch, gymnastics studio, sports hall with multiple basketball and volleyball courts, swimming pool, two tennis courts, and multiple classrooms.

Curriculum 
NIST is a licensed IB World School, offering all three programmes of the International Baccalaureate: the Primary Years Programme (PYP) for students from 3–11, the Middle Years Programme (MYP) for students from 11–16 and the IB Diploma Programme (IBDP) for those from 16–18. All classes, with the exception of second language courses, are taught in English.

In line with the IB philosophy and learner profile, the school adopts an academic approach that emphasizes collaboration, hands-on learning and exploration. Students learn both on and off campus through service activities, internships and the school's annual off-campus experiential learning trips. As a compulsory part of the curriculum, all NIST students must also learn a language other than English.

In 2014 NIST partnered with Yokohama International School and Zurich International School in offering the Global Citizen Diploma (GCD), an optional, additive certificate that reflects graduates' leadership, service and community engagement. Current members of the GCD consortium include NIST, ACS International Schools, Hong Kong Academy, Le Jardin Academy, Nanjing International School and Yokohama International School The GCD aims to identify "the diversity of gifts students may have, rather than assuming the importance of any particular set of skills or knowledge, based on any cultural bias."

NIST's previous five graduation cohorts from the Classes of 2016-2020 earned an average 35.4 on the IB diploma examinations compared to the world average of 30.2, with over half of the students earning a bilingual diploma compared to the respective global average of 23.6%.

Extra-curricular activities
NIST was one of the founding members of the Southeast Asian Schools Athletic Conference (SEASAC), an association of twelve major international schools in Hong Kong, Thailand, Singapore, Malaysia, Myanmar and Indonesia. SEASAC events include sports, arts and academic competitions. NIST's athletic teams also compete in the Bangkok International Schools Athletic Conference (BISAC). NIST has varsity teams for tennis, badminton, swimming, softball and rugby. All NIST teams are the Falcons, named for the school mascot, and wear blue uniforms highlighted with silver, grey and/or white.

Sports at NIST
 Football at NIST International School
 Basketball at NIST International School
 Volleyball at NIST International School
 Badminton at NIST International School
 Cross Country at NIST International School
 Golf at NIST International School
 Gymnastics at NIST International School
 Rugby Sevens at NIST International School
 Softball at NIST International School
 Touch at NIST International School
 Swimming at NIST International School
 T-Ball at NIST International School

Notable alumni
  Nanon (Muon) Nampeeti, Class of 2021: atlas 2021-
 Anchilee Scott-Kemmis, Class of 2017: Miss Universe Thailand 2021
 Korakrit Arunanondchai, Class of 2005: Filmmaker, painter & performance artist; winner of the 2018 Ammodo Tiger Short Award at the International Film Festival Rotterdam
 Pailin Wedel, Class of 2000: Photojournalist, film director and producer; winner of the Best International Feature Documentary award at the Hot Docs Canadian International Documentary Festival for the Netflix film Hope Frozen
 Praya Lundberg, Class of 2007: Actress and model; UNHCR Goodwill Ambassador
 Thita Lamsam, Class of 2018: Figure skater; 5-time national champion (2014, 2016, 2018, 2019 & 2020) at Thailand National Figure Skating Championships

External links

 NIST official website

References

Educational institutions established in 1992
International schools in Bangkok
International Baccalaureate schools in Thailand
Non-profit organizations based in Thailand
Private schools in Thailand
United Nations schools
1992 establishments in Thailand